Sir Walter Scott, 1st Baronet of Beauclerc (17 August 1826 – ) was an English building contractor and publisher. Based in Newcastle upon Tyne, Scott began his profession as a mason, before setting up his own building firm, completing many major architectural projects in the North East of England and notable railway stations in London. His publishing house, Walter Scott Publishing Co. brought classic literature to the masses for a low price.

Early life
Scott was born in Abbey Town, Cumberland in 1826. In his youth he was a notable wrestler and was seen as the best wrestler in his weight within his district,  and won several wrestling prizes at local fairs. He moved to Newcastle-upon-Tyne, and began an apprenticeship as a stonemason. After completing his apprenticeship he worked as a builder and began working on several contracts in the local area. By the age of 23 he had set up his own building company.

Major building works
Scott later began winning building contracts in the North East and was the main contractor behind several landmark buildings within Newcastle, including the Tyne Theatre, Byker Bridge and added the portico to Newcastle railway station in 1863. Outside Newcastle he completed rebuilding work at Haggerston Castle and several railway projects in London, including City and South London Railway and the marble arch at the Central London Station.

Publishing
In 1882 Scott acquired The Tyne Publishing Co., a printing and publishing business that was facing impending bankruptcy. Within a few years Scott, trading as the Walter Scott Publishing Co. Ltd., published "several hundred volumes". His publications featured a number of book reprint series (including the Camelot Classics, the Canterbury Poets, the Emerald Library, the Evergreen Library, the Great Writers and the Oxford Library) and a series of original works in The Contemporary Science Series.

Later life
Scott married Anne Brough, daughter of John Brough of Bromfield, Cumberland. They had a large family, including John Scott, the eldest son who became the second Baronet of Beauclerc on the death of his father and Mason and William Martin Scott, England international rugby union players.

He was created a Baronet on 27 July 1907. Scott died at Cape Martin in France on 8 April 1910 and was buried in Menton.

References

1826 births
1910 deaths
English publishers (people)
Baronets in the Baronetage of the United Kingdom
English civil engineering contractors
People from Allerdale
19th-century English businesspeople